For the invasions of Île Bourbon and Île de France (Mauritius) the British government hired a number of transport vessels. Most of the transports were "country ships". Country ships were vessels that were registered in ports of British India such as Bombay and Calcutta, and that traded around India, with Southeast Asia, and China, but that did not sail to England without special authorization from the EIC. In addition, some were "regular ships" of the British East India Company (EIC), and some were "extra ships". Regular ships were on a long-term contract with the EIC, and extra ships were vessels the EIC had chartered for one or more voyages.

The data in the table below comes primarily from an 1814 report from a Select Committee of the House of Commons of the British Parliament, which provided the data only on country ships, giving the names of a large number of vessels, and their burthen (bm).

Also, transliteration of non-English names shows no consistency across sources, making it extremely difficult to try to find more information about the vessels in question.

The British government chartered some nine of these vessels as cartels to carry back to France the French troops that they had captured in these campaigns. An asterisk after the name in the table below designates the vessels.

Country ships

The report in Lloyd's List of the cartel ships states that there was another vessel of unknown name that had also arrived at Morlaix as a cartel. 
The vessel was probably the transport , which the French had captured on 23 August and the Royal Navy had recaptured on 4 September. On 17 June 1811, Ranger had arrived at Plymouth. She had come as a cartel from Mauritius and Morlaix.

East Indiamen

Non-European vessels
Futteh Romer
Grab Naseery
Solomunshaw

Precedent
In 1794 the British government had contemplated an invasion of Mauritius but had cancelled the plan in May. It had intended to use East Indiamen about to sail from England to India and China. One suspects that the logistics of such an operation proved too daunting.

Notes, citations, and references
Notes

Citations

References
Reports and Papers on the Impolicy of Employing Indian Built Ships in the Trade of the East-India Company, and of Admitting Them to British Registry: With Observation on Its Injurious Consequences to the Landed and Shipping Interests, and to the Numerous Branches of Trade Dependent on the Building and Equipment of British-built Ships. (1809). (London:Blacks and Parry).
 
 
 

Age of Sail merchant ships of England
Lists of sailing ships
Lists of ships of the United Kingdom